Nostrand Avenue is a major street in Brooklyn, New York, that runs for  north from Emmons Avenue in Sheepshead Bay to Flushing Avenue in Williamsburg, where it continues as Lee Avenue. It occupies the position of East 30th Street in the Brooklyn street grid. It is named after Gerret Noorstrandt whose family was one of the first families that settled in New Utrecht, Brooklyn, when New York was still a Dutch colony. Between 1790 and 1820, the Nostrand family owned approximately 43 enslaved people.

Description
From Flushing Avenue to Farragut Road, Nostrand Avenue is a one-way two-lane street going southbound only. Between Kings Highway and Avenue X, it is a two-way street with four traffic lanes. South of Avenue X, the avenue is a very wide two-way divided road with six traffic lanes. The avenue, originally called Nostrand Lane, has been open since 1840.

In 2004, the 200th anniversary of Haiti's independence, Nostrand Avenue was co-named Toussaint Louverture Boulevard in honor of the Haitian revolutionary Toussaint Louverture (1743 – 1803).

Public transportation
The street is serviced by the following public transportation:
The B44 & B44 SBS bus, which replaced a streetcar line in 1951, serves the entire avenue.
The BM4 express bus runs on the avenue between Avenue K and Quentin Road.
The New York City Subway's IRT Eastern Parkway Line has one local station on Eastern Parkway.
The Long Island Rail Road's Atlantic Branch has one station at Atlantic Avenue.
The New York City Subway's IND Fulton Street Line has one express station on Fulton Street.
The New York City Subway's IND Crosstown Line has one station on Lafayette Avenue.

References

External links

 Brooklyn Nostrand Ave on East Flatbush, Brooklyn NY, is now Toussaint Louverture Boulevard
 Brooklyn Economic Development Corporation

Streets in Brooklyn